Khurin or Khowrin or Khorin or Khvorin may refer to:

Khvorin, Kermanshah
Khvorin, Tehran
Khurin, Damavand, Tehran Province
Khurin, Varamin, Tehran Province